The Morgenland Festival Osnabrück is a German music festival that has taken place since 2005 at various venues in Osnabrück, Germany. The 10-day event interchanges with a 4-day intermezzo in years with an odd number. Apart from musical performances of traditional and contemporary music from the wider Middle Eastern region, other art genres, such as the visual arts, dance and theatre or interdisciplinary projects, have also been part of the festival programme.

History 

The festival first took place in 2005. Michael Dreyer, initiator and founder of the festival, is the artistic director. It is committed to challenging traditional perceptions of the “Orient” and provides the participating artists with time and space, in which they can realize their projects. The musical programme is not imported as a finished product, but  mostly developed during the festival. Apart from renowned artists such as Alim Qasimov (Azerbaijan), Kayhan Kalhor (Iran), Jivan Gasparyan (Armenia), the NDR Bigband or Salman Gambarov (Azerbaijan), many artists who were unknown in the West from countries such as Iran, Iraq, Syria, Pakistan, Lebanon, Israel, Egypt, Azerbaijan, Xinjiang or Turkey have performed at the festival. Highlights of the festival have included guest performances by the Tehran Symphony Orchestra - with works by Persian composers, but also by Beethoven, Tchaikovsky and Frank Zappa – and by the Osnabrück Symphony Orchestra in Tehran, as well as a performance of Bach's St John Passion in Tehran by the Osnabrück Youth Choir. The Morgenland Chamber Orchestra has been an integral part of the festival since 2009: German musicians, together with musicians from the guest countries and diverse soloists, rehearse works which are then performed at the opening of the festival. Past conductors of the orchestra were Nader Mashayekhi (Iran) and Kinan Azmeh (Syria). A further integral part of the festival is the annual exchange of students from the Music and Art School in Osnabrück and the Barenboim-Said Conservatory in Nazareth. The participating students each spend a week in the host country and rehearse a programme, which is then performed at the end of the festival.

Organisers and Patrons 

The Morgenland Festival Osnabrück is a cooperation between the City of Osnabrück and the Culture Centre Lagerhalle Osnabrück. Various institutions and companies support the Morgenland Festival Osnabrück financially. Long-term patrons of the event are the Stiftung Niedersachsen (Lower Saxony Foundation), the Niedersächsische Sparkassenstiftung (Foundation of the Lower Saxony Savings Banks), the Sparkasse Osnabrück, Musikland Niedersachsen, the Lower Saxony Ministry of Science and Culture, NDR Musikförderung (NDR Music Patronage), the Landschaftsverband Osnabrücker Land (Regional Authority for the Rural District of Osnabrück), Sievert AG and Hinrichs Licht und Druck.

Venues 

The venues vary from year to year, and have included:

 Lagerhalle Osnabrück
 St. Marien Church Osnabrück
 St. Peter's Cathedral Osnabrück
 OsnabrückHalle
 Kunsthalle Dominikanerkirche
 Schlossaula of Osnabrück University

Awards 

In 2009 Michael Dreyer received the Lower Saxony Praetorius Music Award in the category “International Award for Music for Peace”.

Society of Friends of the Morgenland Festival Osnabrück 

Since 2009, the charitable organisation Society of Friends of the Morgenland Festival has focused its activities towards collecting funds to finance projects relating to the Festival. They have so far produced a documentary book of photographs (2005–2009) as well as a documentary film, “Eastern Voices”, which is available as Blu-ray and DVD from EuroArts. Furthermore, the Society organizes trips to exhibitions, tours and concerts for its members.

Publications 

 2009 Yulduz Turdieva - The rising star of the East (CD)
 2009 Ibrahim Keivo - The voice of ancient Syria (CD)
 2009 Alim Qasimov & Fargana Qasimova - Intimate Dialogue (CD)
 2009 Salman Gambarov & Bakustic Jazz - Live at Morgenland Festival Osnabrück (CD)
 2010 Shourouk. Soloists of the Morgenland Festival Osnabrück with the NDR Bigband and the Osnabrück Symphony Orchestra (CD)
 2010 Ayshemgul Memet - The female voice of Uyghur muqams and folk songs (CD)
 Eastern Voices – Morgenland Festival 2006 - 2010 (CD), published by Dreyer.Gaido
 2010 Eastern Voices (DVD), a documentary by Frank Scheffer and Günter Wallbrecht, published by EuroArts

Commissioned works 

 Franghiz Alizadeh: Deyishme for Double Bass, Tabla and Orchestra
P 2005, Nabil Shehata (Double Bass), Sankha Chatterjee (Tabla), Kammerakademie Potsdam, Conductor David Geringas
 Nader Mashayekhi: fié ma fié III for Voice and Orchestra
P 2006, Salar Aghili, Tehran Symphony Orchestra, Conductor Nader Mashayekhi
 Saed Haddad: Alternative world-versions for Piano and Orchestra
P 2007, Saleem Abboud Ashkar (Piano), Münchner Rundfunkorchester, Conductor Frank Cramer
 Cymin Samawatie: Vocal Diary. Inspired by works of the Iranian painter Golnar Tabibzadeh
P 2007, Cymin Samawatie Trio
 Nader Mashayekhi: moulana for Voice and Orchestra
P 2008, Salar Aghili, Münchner Rundfunkorchester, Conductor Frank Cramer
 Nouri Iskandar: Alkhareef (Autumn) - Am Rande der Kälte (At the edge of coldness)
P 2009, Ibrahim Keivo (Voice), Morgenland Chamber Orchestra, Conductor Nader Mashayekhi
 Kinan Azmeh: Fantasy in three characters

P 2010, Kinan Azmeh (Clarinet), Ibrahim Keivo (Voice), Osnabrück Symphony Orchestra,  Conductor Hermann Bäumer

Filmography 

 2007 A Passage to Iran, documentary film by Amir Hossein Ahooie
 2007 Unisono, documentary film by Frank Scheffer & Lucas van Woerkum
 2008 From Tehran Underground to Osnabrück. One night with the Iranian rock band DA-SH, documentary film by Shahriyar Ahadi
 2010 Eastern Voices, documentary film by Frank Scheffer and Günter Wallbrecht
 2010 Road to Osnabrück, documentary film by Mukaddas Mijit

External links 
 Official Website
 Morgenland Festival Osnabrück on Kulturmarken.de
 Lagerhalle e.V.
Dreyer-Gaido record label
Morgenland Festival on YouTube

References 

Music festivals in Germany
Tourist attractions in Osnabrück
2005 establishments in Germany
Music festivals established in 2005
Culture of Lower Saxony